This page lists board games, card games, and wargames published in the 1960s.

Games released or invented in the 1960s

Significant games-related events in the 1960s
 Parker Brothers is bought by General Mills (1963).
 Hassenfeld Brothers changes its name to Hasbro Industries and begins public trading on the American Stock Exchange (1968).
 Simulations Publications, Inc. founded by James F. Dunnigan (1969).

Games
Games by decade